In geometry, an orthant or hyperoctant is the analogue in n-dimensional Euclidean space of a quadrant in the plane or an octant in three dimensions.

In general an orthant in n-dimensions can be considered the intersection of n mutually orthogonal half-spaces. By independent selections of half-space signs, there are 2n orthants in n-dimensional space.

More specifically, a closed orthant in Rn is a subset defined by constraining each Cartesian coordinate to be nonnegative or nonpositive.  Such a subset is defined by a system of inequalities:
ε1x1 ≥ 0      ε2x2 ≥ 0     · · ·     εnxn ≥ 0,
where each εi is +1 or −1.

Similarly, an open orthant in Rn is a subset defined by a system of strict inequalities
ε1x1 > 0      ε2x2 > 0     · · ·     εnxn > 0,
where each εi is +1 or −1.

By dimension:
In one dimension, an orthant is a ray.
In two dimensions, an orthant is a quadrant.
In three dimensions, an orthant is an octant.

John Conway defined the term n-orthoplex from orthant complex as a regular polytope in n-dimensions with 2n simplex facets, one per orthant.

The nonnegative orthant is the generalization of the first quadrant to n-dimensions and is important in many constrained optimization problems.

See also
 Cross polytope (or orthoplex) – a family of regular polytopes in n-dimensions which can be constructed with one simplex facets in each orthant space.
 Measure polytope (or hypercube) – a family of regular polytopes in n-dimensions which can be constructed with one vertex in each orthant space.
 Orthotope – generalization of a rectangle in n-dimensions, with one vertex in each orthant.

References

Further reading
 The facts on file: Geometry handbook, Catherine A. Gorini, 2003, p.113

Euclidean geometry
Linear algebra

zh:卦限